Khajuri Kamsar is a village in Dildarnagar Kamsar in the Indian state of Uttar Pradesh. Its  situated on the bank of Karamsaha.  As of 2011 census the main population of the village lived in an area of 44 acres with 531 households.

Historical population

References 

Dildarnagar
Dildarnagar Fatehpur
Cities and towns in Ghazipur district
Towns and villages in Kamsar